NRG station (formerly named AT&T station, and earlier Pattison station) is the southern terminus of SEPTA's Broad Street Line, located at 3600 South Broad Street, at the intersection with Pattison Avenue in the South Philadelphia area of Philadelphia, Pennsylvania. The station's naming rights were sold to NRG Energy in 2018. Previously, naming rights were sold to AT&T for eight years.

NRG station is located within short walking distance of the South Philadelphia Sports Complex, providing access to Citizens Bank Park, Lincoln Financial Field, the Wells Fargo Center, and Xfinity Live! Philadelphia, the home venues of Philadelphia's four main professional sports teams – the Phillies, Flyers, 76ers, and Eagles, as well as the Temple University football team, select games of the Villanova University men's basketball team, and Philadelphia Wings lacrosse team.

All local Broad Street Line trains serve the station. SEPTA often operates special "Sports Express" trains before and after large events. These trains run nonstop between NRG and Walnut–Locust stations and make express stops north to Fern Rock Transportation Center. The station has a park and ride lot not operated by SEPTA; it is used for stadium parking during sporting events.

History 

Pattison station opened for service on April 8, 1973 as one of the last two stations of the Broad Street subway to open, the other being the neighboring Oregon station. From 1938 until this station's opening, the line terminated at Snyder station. The two-station extension was built at a cost of $37 million in 1973 dollars.

Renaming 
On June 17, 2010 the station was renamed "AT&T Station." Naming rights were sold to AT&T for five years at a cost of $5 million; SEPTA netted $3 million, while the agency's advertising contractor Titan Outdoor (now Intersection) received the remaining $2 million. The costs for renaming – included changing of all mentions of the station throughout the line to "AT&T Station and Sports Complex" – were covered by the $3 million. The initial contract was later extended for an additional three years.

On July 25, 2018, SEPTA announced that NRG Energy had agreed to a five-year contract for the station's naming rights, paying $5.25 million. The name change to NRG Station took effect on August 1 and was inaugurated on August 14. Intersection received 15% of this contract, or about $800,000. It cost about $150,000 to change around 7,000 signs in the SEPTA system to reflect the name change, as well as $97,000 to reprint 6,000 route maps. The contract also allows NRG to set up marketing tables in SEPTA stations, as well as rentable portable phone chargers in this station.

Station layout 
Much like Oregon station, NRG station has its fare control barriers at four street-level headhouses, all located on the east side of Broad Street. The station has an unusually wide and long island platform to accommodate crush capacity crowds that occur regularly after events at the Sports Complex. There is an additional, infrequently-used platform on a level immediately beneath the regular service platform which is visible from the gated stairways along the length of the platform.

References

External links 

SEPTA Broad Street Line stations
Railway stations in Philadelphia
Railway stations in the United States opened in 1973
South Philadelphia
1973 establishments in Pennsylvania
Railway stations located underground in Pennsylvania